Hazrat Nizamuddin – Jabalpur Express is a SuperFast category train of Indian Railways, which runs between Hazrat Nizamuddin railway station of Delhi, the capital city of India and Jabalpur Junction railway station of Jabalpur, the major tourist city of Central Indian state, Madhya Pradesh. The train is India's ISO Certified train.

Arrival and departure
 Train no.22182 departs from Hazrat Nizamuddin, daily at 17:45 from platform no.5 reaching Jabalpur, the next day at 08:40.

Route and halts
The train goes via Agra & Jhansi Junction. The important halts of the train are:
 Hazrat Nizamuddin
 Agra Cantonment
Mathura Junction
 Gwalior Junction
 Jhansi Junction
 Lalitpur Junction
 Bina Malkhedi Junction
 Khurai
 Saugor
 Patharia
 Damoh
 Bandakpur
 Katni
 Sihora Road
 Jabalpur

Coach composite
The train consists of 24 coaches :
 1 AC I Tier
 2 AC II Tier
 3 AC III Tier
 12 Sleeper Coaches
 4 Un Reserved
 1 Ladies/handicapped
 1 Luggage/Brake Van

Average speed and frequency
The train runs with an average speed of 62 km/h. The train runs on daily basis from both the sites.

Loco link
The train is hauled by a Katni WDM 3A diesel engine from Jabalpur till Katni.  From Katni a single Tuglakabad WAP7 electric locomotive takes the charge.

Rake maintenance & sharing
The train is maintained by the Jabalpur Coaching Depot. The same rake is used for Hazrat Nizamuddin–Bhopal Express for one way which is altered by the second rake on the other way.

See also
Mahakoshal Express
Indore Junction
Bhopal Junction

References

External links 

Transport in Jabalpur
Transport in Delhi
Railway services introduced in 2013
Rail transport in Madhya Pradesh
Rail transport in Uttar Pradesh
Rail transport in Delhi
Express trains in India